Echinoplectanum pudicum is a species of diplectanid monogenean parasitic on the gills of the leopard coralgrouper, Plectropomus leopardus. It has been described in 2006.

This species was distinguished from all other species of the genus Echinoplectanum by the shape and small size of its male copulatory organ, and the apparent absence of a sclerotised vagina.

Etymology

The epithet pudicum (Latin for bashful, chaste) refers to the low level of development of the reproductive organs.

Hosts and localities

The leopard  coral grouper Plectropomus leopardus is the type-host of Echinoplectanum pudicum. The type-locality is the coral reef off Nouméa, New Caledonia.
In New Caledonia, this fish harbours three species of the genus Echinoplectanum, namely E. pudicum, E. rarum and E. leopardi.

References

External links 

Diplectanidae
Animals described in 2006
Fauna of New Caledonia